High Rocks Park is a public park and swimming hole in Gladstone, Oregon, United States.

The park has been known for hosting summer recreation, as well as for diving and swimming accidents.

References

External links

 High Rocks Park at the City of Gladstone, Oregon

Gladstone, Oregon
Parks in Clackamas County, Oregon